WQKQ (92.1 FM, "KQ92") is a radio station licensed to serve Dallas City, Illinois, United States, serving the Burlington, Iowa area. The station is owned by the Pritchard Broadcasting Corporation.

It broadcasts a classic rock format from studios located in Burlington, Iowa.  WQKQ is The Bob & Tom Show affiliate for the Burlington-Fort Madison Area.

History

The station was first licensed in 1978 as WCAZ-FM in Carthage, Illinois. The station was subsequentially assigned, by the Federal Communications Commission, the call letters WZBN in 1995, WNKK in 1997, and WQKQ on April 11, 2000.

References

External links
WQKQ official website
Pritchard Broadcasting - Burlington Radio

FCC History Cards for WQKQ (covering 1977-1981 as WCAZ-FM)

QKQ
Hancock County, Illinois
Radio stations established in 1978
1978 establishments in Illinois